List of hospitals in Ohio (U.S. state), sorted by county and name of hospital or medical center.

Adams County
Adams County Regional Medical Center - Seaman

Allen County
Bluffton Hospital  - Bluffton
Institute for Orthopaedic Surgery - Lima
St. Rita's Medical Center - Lima

Ashland County
University Hospitals Samaritan Medical Center - Ashland

Ashtabula County
Ashtabula County Medical Center - Ashtabula
Glenbeigh Hospital - Rock Creek
University Hospitals Conneaut Medical Center (formerly Brown Memorial Hospital) - Conneaut
University Hospitals Geneva Medical Center (formerly Memorial Hospital of Geneva) - Geneva

Athens County
Doctors Hospital of Nelsonville - Nelsonville
O'Bleness Hospital - Athens

Auglaize County
Joint Township District Memorial Hospital - Saint Marys, Ohio

Belmont County
Barnesville Hospital - Barnesville
Belmont Community Hospital - Bellaire
East Ohio Regional Hospital - Martins Ferry

Brown County
Brown County General Hospital - Georgetown

Butler County
Bethesda Butler County Medical Center - Hamilton
Kettering Health Hamilton - Hamilton, Formerly Fort Hamilton Hospital
McCullough-Hyde Memorial Hospital - Oxford, Ohio
Mercy Hospital Fairfield - Fairfield
West Chester Hospital - West Chester

Champaign County
Mercy Memorial Hospital - Urbana

Clark County
Kettering Health Springfield - Springfield
Ohio Valley Medical Center - Springfield
Springfield Regional Medical Center - Springfield

Clermont County
Clermont Mercy Hospital  - Batavia

Clinton County
Clinton Memorial Hospital - Wilmington

Columbiana County
East Liverpool City Hospital - East Liverpool
Salem Regional Medical Center - Salem

Coshocton County
Coshocton County Memorial Hospital - Coshocton

Crawford County
Bucyrus Hospital - Bucyrus
Galion Hospital - Galion

Cuyahoga County
Beachwood Medical Center - Beachwood 
Euclid Hospital - Euclid
Fairview Hospital - Cleveland 
Hillcrest Hospital - Mayfield Heights
Lutheran Hospital - Cleveland
Marymount Hospital - Garfield Heights
MetroHealth Medical Center - Cleveland
Rainbow Babies & Children's Hospital - Cleveland
South Pointe Hospital - Warrensville Heights
Southwest General Health Center - Middleburg Heights
University Hospitals St. John Medical Center - Westlake
St. Vincent Charity Medical Center - Cleveland
University Hospitals Ahuja Medical Center - Beachwood
University Hospitals Cleveland Medical Center - Cleveland
University Hospitals MacDonald Women's Hospital - Cleveland
University Hospitals Parma Medical Center - Parma
University Hospitals Seidman Cancer Center - Cleveland

Darke County
Wayne Memorial Hospital - Greenville

Defiance County
Community Memorial Hospital - Hicksville
ProMedica Defiance Regional Hospital - Defiance
Mercy Hospital of Defiance - Defiance

Delaware County
Grady Memorial Hospital - Delaware

Erie County
Firelands Regional Medical Center - Sandusky

Fairfield County
 Diley Ridge Medical Center - Pickerington
Fairfield Medical Center - Lancaster
Pickerington Medical Campus - Pickerington

Fayette County
 Fayette County Memorial Hospital - Washington C.H.

Franklin County
 Mount Carmel East - Columbus
 Mount Carmel Grove City - Grove City
 Mount Carmel Hilliard - Hilliard
Mount Carmel New Albany - New Albany
Mount Carmel St. Ann's - Westerville
Mount Carmel West Hospital - Columbus
 Nationwide Children's Hospital  - Columbus
 Arthur G.H. Bing, MD Cancer Center - Columbus
 Doctors Hospital - Columbus
 Dublin Methodist Hospital - Dublin 
Grant Medical Center - Columbus 
Grove City Methodist Hospital - Grove City
OhioHealth Rehabilitation Hospital - Columbus 
Riverside Methodist Hospital - Columbus 
McConnell Heart Hospital at Riverside - Columbus
 Brain and Spine Hospital - Columbus
 Dodd Rehabilitation Hospital - Columbus
 OSU East Hospital - Columbus
 The James Cancer Hospital and Solove Research Institute - Columbus
 OSU Harding Hospital  - Columbus
 Richard M. Ross Heart Hospital - Columbus
 Talbot Hall - Columbus
 Ohio State University Wexner Medical Center - Columbus

Fulton County
 Fulton County Health Center - Wauseon

Gallia County
Holzer Medical Center - Gallipolis

Geauga County
Heather Hill - Chardon
University Hospitals Geauga Medical Center (formerly Geauga Community Hospital) - Chardon

Greene County
Kettering Health Greene Memorial - Xenia, Formerly Greene Memorial Hospital
Soin Medical Center -Kettering Health - Beavercreek

Guernsey County
Southeastern Ohio Regional Medical Center - Cambridge

Hamilton County
Bethesda North Hospital - Montgomery
Christ Hospital - Cincinnati
Cincinnati Children's Hospital Medical Center - Cincinnati
Good Samaritan Hospital - Cincinnati
Jewish Hospital - Kenwood
Mercy Hospital Anderson - Anderson Twp
Mercy Hospital West - Cincinnati
Shriners Hospital for Children - Cincinnati
University of Cincinnati Medical Center - Cincinnati

Hancock County
Blanchard Valley Hospital - Findlay 
Fostoria Community Hospital - Fostoria

Hardin County
Hardin Memorial Hospital - Kenton

Harrison County
Harrison Community Hospital - Cadiz

Highland County
Highland District Hospital - Hillsboro

Henry County
Henry County Hospital - Napoleon

Huron County
Fisher-Titus Medical Center - Norwalk
Mercy Hospital of Willard - Willard

Jackson County

Holzer Medical Center - Jackson

Jefferson County
Acuity Specialty Hospital - Steubenville
Trinity Medical Center East
Trinity Medical Center West

Knox County
Knox Community Hospital

Lake County
University Hospital TriPoint Medical Center - Concord Township
University Hospital Lake West Medical Center - Willoughby

Lawrence County
St. Mary's Medical Center, Ironton Campus - Ironton

Licking County
Licking Memorial Hospital - Newark

Logan County
Mary Rutan Hospital - Bellefontaine

Lorain County
Mercy Allen Medical Center - Oberlin
Mercy Regional Medical Center - Lorain
Cleveland Clinic Avon Hospital (Avon campus) - Avon
University Hospitals Elyria Medical Center - Elyria

Lucas County
 Mercy Health Children's Hospital - Toledo
 Mercy Health St. Anne Hospital - Toledo
 Mercy Health St. Charles Hospital - Oregon
 Mercy Health St. Vincent Medical Center - Toledo
Promedica Bay Park Hospital - Oregon
Promedica Flower Hospital - Sylvania
Promedica Russell J. Ebeid Children's Hospital - Toledo
ProMedica Toledo Hospital - Toledo
St. Luke's Hospital - Maumee
University of Toledo Medical Center - Toledo

Madison County
Madison Health - London

Mahoning County
Northside Medical Center - Youngstown
St Elizabeth Boardman Health Center - Boardman
St Elizabeth Emergency - Austintown
St. Elizabeth Youngstown Hospital - Youngstown

Marion County
Marion General Hospital -Marion

Medina County
 Cleveland Clinic Lodi Community Hospital-Lodi 
Cleveland Clinic Medina Hospital-Medina 
Summa Wadsworth-Rittman Hospital-Wadsworth

Mercer County

Miami County
Upper Valley Medical Center - Troy 
Kettering Health Piqua - Piqua, Ohio
Kettering Health Troy - Troy, Formerly Troy Hospital

Montgomery County
Access Hospital Dayton  - Dayton
Dayton Children's Hospital - Dayton
Dayton VA Medical Center - Dayton
Kettering Health Behavioral Medical Center - Miami Township, Montgomery County, Ohio, Formerly Kettering Behavioral Medicine Center
Kettering Health Dayton - Dayton, Formerly Grandview Medical Center
Kettering Health Huber - Huber Heights, Formerly Huber Health Center
Kettering Health Main Campus - Dayton, Formerly Kettering Medical Center
Kettering Health Miamisburg - Miamisburg, Formerly Sycamore Medical Center
Kettering Health Washington Township - Washington Township, Montgomery County, Ohio, Formerly Southview Medical Center
Kindred Hospital - Dayton
Medical Center at Elizabeth Place - Dayton
Miami Valley Hospital - Dayton 
Miami Valley Hospital South - Centerville  
Riverview Health Institute - Dayton 
Wright-Patterson Medical Center - Dayton

Morrow County
Morrow County Hospital - Mt. Gilead
Muskingum County

Ottawa County
Magruder Hospital - Port Clinton

Paulding County
Paulding County Hospital - Paulding

Pickaway County

Pike County
Pike Community Hospital - Waverly

Portage County
University Hospitals Portage Medical Center - Ravenna

Preble County
Kettering Health Preble - Eaton, Formerly Preble County Medical Center

Putnam County
Putnam County Ambulatory Care Center - Glandorf

Richland County
Avita Health System Ontario Hospital - Ontario
Mansfield Hospital - Mansfield 
Shelby Hospital - Shelby

Ross County
Adena Regional Medical Center - Chillicothe

Sandusky County
The Bellevue Hospital - Bellevue
Memorial Hospital - Fremont

Scioto County
King's Daughters Medical Center Ohio - Portsmouth
Southern Ohio Medical Center - Portsmouth

Seneca County
Mercy Hospital of Tiffin  - Tiffin

Shelby County
Wilson Memorial Hospital - Sidney

Stark County
Aultman Alliance Community Hospital - Alliance
Aultman Hospital - Canton
Mercy Medical Center - Canton

Summit County
Akron Children's Hospital - Akron
Summa Akron City Hospital - Akron 
Cleveland Clinic Akron General Hospital - Akron 
Summa Saint Thomas Hospital - Akron 
Summa Barberton Citizens Hospital - Barberton 
Western Reserve Hospital - Cuyahoga Falls

Trumbull County
St. Joseph Warren Hospital - Warren 
Trumbull Regional Medical Center - Warren

Tuscarawas County
Union Hospital - Dover
Trinity Hospital Twin City - Dennison

Union County
Memorial Hospital - Marysville

Warren County
Atrium Medical Center - Middletown 
Bethesda Medical Center at Arrow Springs - Lebanon 
Kettering Health Middletown - Middletown

Washington County
Marietta Memorial Hospital - Marietta
Selby General Hospital - Marietta

Wayne County
Dunlap Memorial Hospital - Orrville

Williams County
CHWC Bryan Hospital - Bryan
CHWC Montpelier Hospital - Montpelier

Wood County

Perrysburg Hospital - Perrysburg
Wood County Hospital - Bowling Green
Wyandot County
Wyandot Memorial Hospital - Upper Sandusky

References

Ohio

Hospitals